La Mega may refer to:

Companies
 La Mega Media, an American media company

Radio stations
 KXOL-FM in Los Angeles, California
 WMEG and WEGM in Puerto Rico
 WOXY (FM) in Mason, Ohio
 WSKQ-FM in New York City
 WSTL in Providence, Rhode Island
 WTIS in Tampa, Florida
 WTKZ in Allentown, Pennsylvania
 WVKO-FM in Johnstown, Ohio

See also
 Mega (disambiguation)
 The Megas (disambiguation)